Dance Hall Crashers (often abbreviated to DHC) was an American ska punk band formed in 1989 in Berkeley, California.  Initially founded by former Operation Ivy members Tim Armstrong and Matt Freeman, the band has had a fluid lineup over its career, with the most recent lineup (last active in 2004) includes Elyse Rogers and Karina Deniké on vocals, brothers Jason Hammon and Gavin Hammon on guitar and drums respectively, and Mikey Weiss on bass.  They have released four studio albums, highlighted by the 1995 release Lockjaw which featured the minor hit song "Enough", produced by Rob Cavallo and featured in the film Angus.

Biography

Early years
The original incarnation of the Dance Hall Crashers (named after the Alton Ellis song "Dance Crasher") was formed in 1989 by Matt Freeman and Tim Armstrong, formerly of the seminal Bay Area ska-punk band Operation Ivy, after both musicians expressed an interest in starting a band rooted in more traditional ska and rocksteady than what they had been playing with Operation Ivy. The first line-up featured Armstrong on vocals and Freeman on guitar, as well as drummer Erik Larsen (whom they specifically lured away from a rocksteady band called "The Liquidators").  The band also featured keyboardist Joey Schaaf, vocalists Ingrid Jonsson and Andrew Champion, guitarist Grant McIntire, and bassist Joel Wing.

The band experimented with various songs and styles until they played their first show at 924 Gilman Street in Berkeley in 1989. Shortly after their debut, however, Freeman and Armstrong left to pursue other interests, mainly another punk-based ska project called Downfall.

After numerous membership changes which eventually left only the original drummer Larsen and bassist Wing, DHC solidified a line-up with dual vocalists Karina Deniké Schwarz and Elyse Rogers, guitarists Jason Hammon and Jaime McCormick, and drummer Gavin Hammon (Jason's brother). Following a period of steady gigging, DHC finally caught a break after being booked at an all-ska Earth Day festival at Berkeley's Greek Theatre in 1990, opening for Bad Manners. That year, the band recorded their debut album for Moon Ska Records, though trouble within the band led to a break-up soon after.

Breakthrough
Their debut album became a word-of-mouth underground hit even with the band disbanded, and the group reunited in 1991 at Slim's for a sold-out performance. In 1992, bowing to fan pressure, DHC reunited for a one-off series of gigs, but after the positive response to their performance, the band chose to reform on a permanent basis. In 1993, to commemorate their reunion, Moon Records released a CD compilation of the band's entire body of work from 1989 to 1992, appropriately titled 1989-1992.

As the band began touring nationally by the mid-1990s, the line-up changed once again, now featuring Rogers, Denike, Hammon, his brother Gavin Hammon on drums, guitarist Scott Goodell and bassist Mikey Weiss. In 1995, DHC were the very first group signed to MCA Records subsidiary 510 records, and issued their second LP Lockjaw the same year. Lockjaw was the first DHC release without a horn section, and had a harder, guitar-driven pop punk sound than the band's prior recordings. The album's single, "Enough", was featured on the soundtrack to the film Angus, and the accompanying music video received moderate airplay on MTV's 120 Minutes. Weiss recalls that he was working in a record store when Lockjaw was released; curious customers would ask about the band or their sound, and the other employees would point him out as the bass player.

A re-issue of 1989-1992 was released as The Old Record in late 1996 on Fat Wreck Chords' Honest Don's label.  DHC's second MCA record, Honey, I'm Homely!, was released in 1997. This proved to be the band's breakthrough album, peaking at No. 22 on Billboard's Top Heatseekers. The leading singles "Lost Again" and "Mr. Blue" enjoyed steady rotation on local and college radio stations across the United States, and music videos were filmed for both tracks.

The band toured extensively throughout the mid to late 1990s, both as a headliner and opening for bands such as The Mighty Mighty Bosstones and Bad Religion. In addition, the band played festivals such as the Warped Tour and Lilith Fair. Due to the heavy touring schedule, Scott Goodell bowed out from his guitar duties in 1996; the band asked Phil Ensor from Limp and later, Billy Bouchard to stand in for live shows until the need for a second guitarist was nixed and Hammon handled all guitar parts himself.

Hiatus and reunions
In 1998, DHC released their last release with MCA, the EP Blue Plate Special. The EP contained a short collection of songs recorded for other compilations/soundtracks, unreleased and remixed material, and a CD-ROM of photos and the band's four music videos. In 1999, the band signed with independent label Pink and Black Records, releasing their fourth LP Purr in 1999 and the live album The Live Record: Witless Banter and 25 Mildly Antagonistic Songs About Love in 2000.

DHC started playing less frequently in the early 2000s, limiting their performances to West Coast shows and occasional appearances at events such as the 2002 Winter Olympics in Salt Lake City. In November 2004, the band recorded a show at the Hollywood House of Blues which was later released on DVD by Kung Fu Records as part of their The Show Must Go Off! series. Although the performance included an unreleased song and made mention of the band working on a new studio album, the show proved to be DHC's last performance to date as the band has since gone on hiatus. Although they have not explicitly stated having broken up, there has been no announcement of any future plans to resume touring or recording.

References in popular culture 
The band is referenced (alongside Unwritten Law) in the lyric "Yeah my girlfriend likes UL and DHC" on Blink-182's 1998 single "Josie".

Discography

Studio albums
Dance Hall Crashers (1990), Moon Records
Lockjaw (1995), MCA Records
Honey, I'm Homely! (1997), MCA
Purr (1999), Pink and Black

EPs
Blue Plate Special EP (1998), MCA

Live albums
The Live Record: Witless Banter & 25 Mildly Antagonistic Songs About Love (2000), Pink and Black
Live at the House of Blues (2005), (The Show Must Go Off! live DVD)

Compilations
1989-1992 (1993), Moon Records (includes most of contents of first two releases, and some single/compilation material)
The Old Record (1996), Honest Don's Records (reprint of 1989-1992 with the song "Time To Ease Up" excluded)

Demos
Say Cheese (1989), Self-Released Demo (Cassette Only)

Members

Current
 Elyse Rogers – vocals, 
 Karina Deniké – vocals
 Jason Hammon – guitar
 Mikey Weiss – bass
 Gavin Hammon – drums

Former
 Mat Snyder - trombone
 Tim Armstrong – vocals
 Andrew "Andrew Champion" Ataie – vocals
 J. Grant Mcintire – guitar
 Alex Baker – bass
 Phil Ensor – guitar
 Billy Bouchard – guitar
 Matt Freeman – vocals, bass
 Scott Goodell – guitar
 Jeremy Goody – Trumpet
 Ingrid Jonsson – vocals
 Erik Larsen, aka Erik Kolacek – drums
 Jaime McCormick – guitar
 Joey Schaaf – keyboard
 Mike Shawcross – drums
 Joel Wing – bass
 Harvey Hawks - trumpet
 Jason Bermak - saxophone
 Matt Morrish - saxophone

References

External links

Joey Schaaf, a Musical biography at LoudRockMusic.com

Reviews

Musical groups established in 1989
Musical groups from Berkeley, California
American ska punk musical groups
Pop punk groups from California
Third-wave ska groups